Liantang station is a metro station on Line 2 and Line 8 of the Shenzhen Metro. It opened on 28 October 2020.

Line 2 merges into Line 8 at this station, with trains on Line 2 continuing service to Yantian Road station and trains on Line 8 continuing service to Chiwan station. There is no need for passengers to get off and transfer at this station.

Station layout

Exits

References

Shenzhen Metro stations
Railway stations in Guangdong
Luohu District
Railway stations in China opened in 2020